Christian Jose Nsi Amougou (born 8 June 1989) is a professional footballer from Cameroon.

V.League Career

Dong Nai

As persistent injury problems compelled him to miss the whole 2014 V.League 1, he was sold from Binh Duong to Dong Nai F.C. where he scored 14 goals.

Binh Duong

Signing a one-year contract with Becamex Binh Duong F.C. in 2016, he was known for his distinctive goal celebration where he imitated a cameraman's antics.

Personal life
Living in Vietnam for over 6 years, he can be granted citizenship but chooses not to.

References

External links
 

Living people
1989 births
Cameroonian footballers
Cameroonian expatriate footballers
Association football forwards
Dong Thap FC players
Than Quang Ninh FC players
Xuan Thanh Saigon Cement FC players
Becamex Binh Duong FC players
Dong Nai FC players
Can Tho FC players
V.League 1 players
Cameroonian expatriate sportspeople in Vietnam
Expatriate footballers in Vietnam